The Polish Legions (also known as the Dąbrowski Legions) in the Napoleonic period, were several Polish military units that served with the French Army, mainly from 1797 to 1803, although some units continued to serve until 1815.

After the Third Partition of Poland in 1795, many Poles believed that Revolutionary France and her allies would come to Poland's aid. France's enemies included Poland's partitioners, Prussia, Austria and Russia. Many Polish soldiers, officers, and volunteers therefore emigrated, especially to the parts of Italy under French rule or serving as client states or sister republics to France (leading to the expression, "the Polish Legions in Italy") and to France itself, where they joined forces with the local military. The number of Polish recruits soon reached many thousands. With support from Napoleon Bonaparte, Polish military units were formed, bearing Polish military ranks and commanded by Polish officers. They became known as the "Polish Legions", a Polish army in exile, under French command. Their best known Polish commanders included Jan Henryk Dąbrowski, Karol Kniaziewicz and Józef Wybicki.

The Polish Legions serving alongside the French Army during the Napoleonic Wars saw  combat in most of Napoleon's campaigns, from the West Indies, through Italy and Egypt. When the Duchy of Warsaw was created in 1807, many of the veterans of the Legions formed a core around which the Duchy's army was raised under Józef Poniatowski. This force fought a victorious war against Austria in 1809 and would go on to fight alongside the French army in numerous campaigns, culminating in the disastrous invasion of Russia in 1812, which marked the end of the Napoleonic empire, including the Legions, and allied states like the Duchy of Warsaw.

Timeframe and numbers
Among historians there is a degree of uncertainty about the period in which the Legions existed. Magocsi et al. notes that "the heyday of their activity" falls in the years 1797–1801, while Lerski defines the Legions as units that operated between 1797 and 1803. Similarly, Davies defines the time of their existence as five to six years. The Polish PWN Encyklopedia defines them as units operating in the period of 1797–1801 (in 1801 the Legions were reorganized into demi-brigades). The Polish WIEM Encyklopedia notes that the Legions ended with the death of most of their personnel in the Haitian campaign, which concluded in 1803. When recounting the history of the Polish Legions, some works also describe the operations of Polish units under the French in the period after 1803; several smaller formations existed in that time, the most notable of which was the Vistula Legion, which existed between 1808 and 1813.

Estimates of the strength of the Polish Legions also vary and it is believed that between 20,000 and 30,000 men served in the Legions' ranks at any one time over the course of their existence. The WIEM Encyklopedia estimate is 21,000 for the period up to 1803. Davies suggests 25,000 for the period of up to 1802–1803, as does Magosci et al. Bideleux and Jeffries offer an estimate of up to 30,000 for the period up to 1801. Most of the soldiers came from the ranks of the peasantry, with only about 10 percent being drawn from the nobility.

Origins
After the Third Partition of Poland (1795), many Poles believed that revolutionary France, whose public opinion was very sympathetic to the ideals of the Polish Constitution of 3 May 1791, would come to Poland's aid. France's enemies included Poland's partitioners, Prussia, Austria and Imperial Russia. Paris was the seat of two Polish organizations laying the claim to be the Polish government-in-exile, the Deputation (Deputacja) of Franciszek Ksawery Dmochowski and the Agency (Agencja) of Józef Wybicki. Many Polish soldiers, officers and volunteers therefore emigrated, especially to Italy and to France. Eventually, the Agency was successful in convincing the French government (the Directory) to organize a Polish military unit. As the French Constitution did not allow for the employment of foreign troops on French soil, the French decided to use the Poles to bolster their allies in Italy, the Cisalpine Republic.

Jan Henryk Dąbrowski, a former high-ranking officer in the army of the Polish–Lithuanian Commonwealth, began his work in 1796 – a year after the total destruction of the Commonwealth. At that time he went to Paris, and later, Milan, where his idea received support from Napoleon Bonaparte, who saw the Poles as a promising source of new recruits, and who superficially appeared receptive to the idea of liberating Poland. Dąbrowski was soon authorized by the French-allied Cisalpine Republic to create the Polish Legions, which would be part of the army of the newly created republic. This agreement, drafted by Napoleon, was signed on 9 January 1797, and marked the formal creation of the Legions.

Operational history

War of the First Coalition: Polish Legions in Italy

The Polish soldiers serving in the Dąbrowski Legion were granted Cisalpine citizenship and were paid the same wage as other troops. They were allowed to use their own unique Polish-style uniforms, with some French and Cisalpine symbols, and were commanded by other Polish speakers. By early February 1797 the Legion was 1,200 strong, having been bolstered by the arrival of many new recruits who had deserted from the Austrian army.

The Dąbrowski Legion was first used against Austrians and their allies in Italy. In March 1797 it garrisoned Mantua, and by the end of the month it took part in its first combat during the Ten Days of Brescia. By the end of April the ranks of the Legion had swelled to 5,000. At that time Dąbrowski lobbied for a plan to push through to the Polish territories in Galicia, but that was eventually rejected by Napoleon who instead decided to use those troops on the Italian front. In April, the Legion took part in quelling the uprising in Verona, known as Veronese Easters. The Treaty of Leoben signed that month, which promised peace between Austrians and French, was a blow to Polish morale, but Dąbrowski correctly assumed that it would not last.

Sources vary with regards to when the singular Dąbrowski Legion was expanded into multiple Legions. Pivka and Roffe note that in May 1797 the Legion was reorganized into two formations, the first being commanded by Karol Kniaziewicz and the second by Józef Wielhorski, each numbering about 3,750 infantry, not counting artillery support. Davies, however, states that the Second Legion was formed in 1798 under Józef Zajączek. In July 1797 the Legions suppressed another insurrection, this time in Reggio Emilia.

The Treaty of Campo Formio, signed on 18 October 1797, resulted in another short period of relative peace. The Legions, hopeful for a renewal of the war, were seen as the most pro-French foreign forces in the Cisapline. In May 1798 the Poles helped the French to secure the Papal States, putting down some peasant revolts, and garrisoned Rome, which they entered on 3 May. Dąbrowski obtained a number of trophies from a Roman representative, that the Polish king, Jan III Sobieski, had sent there after his victory over the Ottoman Empire at the siege of Vienna in 1683; amongst these was an Ottoman standard which subsequently became part of the Legions' colors, accompanying them from then on.

By the end of 1798 the Legions under Kniaziewicz were fighting against the anti-French forces from the Kingdom of Naples, defeating them at the Battle of Civita Castellana on 4 December. Soon afterward, supplies from the captured Gaeta fortress allowed the creation of a Legion cavalry unit under Andrzej Karwowski. The Poles then fought at Magliano, Falari, Calvi and Capua before Naples capitulated on 23 January.

War of the Second Coalition: Italian front
The end of the 1798 and the beginning of 1799 marked the beginning of the War of the Second Coalition. Within about a year of its formation, the Legion had become about 10,000. However, the new series of struggles proved to be much more difficult, as the anti-French coalition advanced upon Italy, now bereft of elite French units which were with Napoleon in Egypt. Overall, 1799 saw the Legions take significant casualties. In mid-1799, the First Legion under General Dąbrowski fought against the Russians at Trebbia (17–19 June 1799), where it suffered heavy casualties (only two of the five battalions survived the battle, and Dąbrowski was wounded). Polish legionaries also fought at the Battle of Novi (15 July 1799), and the Second Battle of Zurich (26 September).

The Second Legion also suffered heavily; particularly in the first battles on the Adige (26 March – 5 April 1799) where it is estimated that it lost about half to two thirds of its complement of 4,000 men. Its commander, General Franciszek Rymkiewicz, was killed at the Battle of Magnano on 5 April. The remainder of the Second Legion became part of the garrison at Mantua, which was soon placed under siege by the Austrians. Finally, at the end of the Siege of Mantua (April–July), the French commander François-Philippe de Foissac-Latour decided to release Polish soldiers – then under Wielhorski – into Austrian custody as the Austrians claimed them to be deserters. This marked the end of the Second Legion, as only a small number of Poles were able to evade capture (the French were allowed to withdraw most of their forces under the condition that they would remain neutral).

War of the Second Coalition: German front
With the end of the Cisalpine Republic, the Legions were reorganized in France, as Napoleon ascended to power as the First Consul and decreed that foreign troops could now serve in the French Army. On 10 February the remnants of the Italian Legions were reorganized near Marseilles into the Italian Legion (La Legion Italique) as a 9,000-strong unit (although soon reduced to 5,000) that would become part of the Army of Italy. The Legion fought at the Peschiera and Mantua.

In 1800 or 1799 (sources vary), Karol Kniaziewicz organized the 6,000-strong Third Legion (the Danube Legion, or the Legion du Rhine) to fight against the Austrians in Bavaria. The Danube Legion, bolstered by Karwowski's cavalry unit, fought as part of the Army of the Rhine at Berg, Bernheim and Offenburg, garrisoning the fortress of Philippsbourg after the armistice of Parsdorf (15 July). Polish forces also fought in the Battle of Hohenlinden on 3 December 1800. According to Davies, the Danube Legion would suffer significant casualties in the short period after the battle and the end of the campaign on 25 December that year.

The size of the Legions decreased after the Treaty of Luneville (9 February 1801), which to the disappointment of the legionnaires made no mention of Poland. The Legions was transferred to police duties in the Kingdom of Etruria. The Legions' morale weakened as Poles were not used in any fights that seemed to directly affect the chance of Poland regaining independence. Many legionnaires, including General Kniaziewicz, felt that they had been used by the French and resigned. Dąbrowski remained in command, and reorganized both Legions at Milan into two 6,000-strong units in March 1801. On 21 December 1801 the Legions were reorganized by the French government into three demi-brigades, with the Italian (First) Legion forming the core of the First and Second Foreign Demi-Brigades (1er and 2e Demi-Brigade Étrangère), and the Danube (Second) Legion, the Third Foreign Demi-Brigade (3e Demi-Brigade Étrangère).

The Haitian campaign

In 1802, France sent most of the disgruntled legionnaires (two demi-brigades, 5,280 strong) to Haiti to put down the Haitian Revolution (on the Caribbean island of Haiti, known then as Saint Domingue, the French West Indies). Napoleon wanted to regain the colony of Saint Domingue, but preferred to save his main French army for more important matters, closer to home. The now inconvenient Polish units were accompanied by contingents of Germans and Swiss French allies, as well as by French units that had fallen out of favour with Napoleon and the French high command.

The Haitian campaign proved disastrous for the legionnaires. Combat casualties and tropical diseases, including the yellow fever, reduced the 5,280-strong Polish contingent to a few hundred survivors in the space of less than two years. By the time the French forces retreated from the island in 1803, about 4,000 Poles had died (either from disease or combat). Of the survivors, about 400 remained on the island, a few dozen were dispersed to the nearby islands or to the United States, and about 700 returned to France (Urbankowski claims 6,000 sent and 330 returned).

The Poles had little interest or desire to support the French cause in the distant colonies, once again fighting against people who only desired their own independence. In Haiti there still is a popular myth that many Polish soldiers became sympathetic to the former slaves' cause and deserted the French, supporting Jean-Jacques Dessalines in significant numbers, with entire units changing sides. In fact, the actual desertion rate was much lower. The loss of that many patriotic military personnel in the Caribbean was a serious blow to the Polish aspirations for regaining independence. The Haitian experience cast further doubts among Poles about France's and Napoleon's good intentions toward Poland.

Wars of the Third and Fourth Coalition

By 1805, during the War of the Third Coalition, the Polish troops in Italy had been renamed the 1st Polish Legion (1e Legion Polonaise) and attached to the Kingdom of Italy. In 1806, all that was left of the old Dąbrowski and Kniaziewicz's Legions was one demi-brigade, consisting of one infantry regiment and one cavalry regiment, now in the service of the Kingdom of Naples. It fought at Castel Franco, turning the Austrian attack on 24 November 1805, but on 3 July 1806 it suffered a severe defeat at Sant'Eufemia a Maiella. Many Polish officers served in French army or allied formations.

During the War of the Fourth Coalition, Napoleon decided to encourage Polish defections from the Prussian army, and on 20 September 1806 decreed the creation of a "Northern Legion" under General Zajączek. As the Napoleon did not want to commit himself to the Polish cause, the Legion was however not explicitly Polish, and was, in Napoleon's words, a gathering of "children of the North". French armies, including the Legion units, defeated the Prussians in Saxony at the battle of Jena and Poles under Dąbrowski entered former Polish territories (near the city of Poznań), which resulted in the influx of recruits for the legion. A year later, Napoleon, having defeated the Russian armies, met with the Russian Tsar Alexander I at Tilsit and in the ensuing negotiations they agreed that a new, small Polish state under French control (the Duchy of Warsaw) would be created.

After the creation of the Duchy of Warsaw: the Vistula Legion
The main period that the Legions were active was between 1797 and 1803. Although some chose to remain with the French forces, and fought in Italy under the Kingdom of Naples, in 1807 many veteran legionnaires formed a cadre for the new Army of the Duchy of Warsaw. In February 1807, the remaining infantry and cavalry regiments who had continued in French service in Italy were reorganized in Silesia, in the cities of Breslau, Neustadt, Neisse, Friedland and Brieg, into a Polish-Italian Legion (PolaccoItalienne), with two new infantry regiments added from the newly liberated Polish lands. On 21 February 1808, the Legion was relocated to France, reinforced with Poles from other French formations, and incorporated into the French army. On 31 March of that year the legion was officially named the Vistula Legion (Légion de la Vistule, Legia Nadwiślańska). By mid-1808 the Vistula Legion had a strength of 6,000. After the Battle of Wagram (5–6 July 1809) Napoleon attempted to form a second Polish Vistula Legion from Polish prisoners of war, but the new formation could not attract sufficient recruits, and in 1810 it was merged into the original Vistula Legion.

During the Peninsular War (1809–1814) in Spain, the Vistula Legion gained fame at the Second Siege of Zaragoza. In the Battle of Fuengirola, a small Polish force managed to repulse an Anglo-Spanish expeditionary force outnumbering them 10-to-1, capturing their commander in the process. Other troops served in Napoleon's Imperial Guard and the Polish Chevau-léger regiment distinguished itself at the Battle of Somosierra in 1808. Another Polish cavalry regiment – the Vistula uhlans – also fought in Spain. They distinguished themselves many times there, including at the Battle of Albuhera in 1811, where they fought to a draw against a combined Anglo-Spanish-Portuguese force. Their effectiveness in that battle inspired the British to create their own lancer units equipped with Polish-style uniforms and weapons.

In 1812, as Napoleon entered Russia, the Poles and Lithuanians rallied to Napoleon's Grande Armée in the hope of resurrecting the Commonwealth. The Vistula Legion, withdrawn from Spain in early 1812 and reorganized into a division (with a planned strength of 10,500 that was never fully attained) was part of Napoleon's invasion forces. Poles formed the largest foreign contingent, 98,000-strong (the entire French Grande Armée was about 600,000 strong). Polish Lancers of the Vistula Legion were the first unit to cross the Neman River when the Grande Armée entered Russia and, as part of the Imperial Guard, the first unit to enter Moscow. They distinguished themselves in the Battle of Borodino and, under Prince Józef Poniatowski (who personally saved Napoleon's life), were one of the units that served as the rear guard during Napoleon's retreat. This later led to the claim that just as they had been the first to enter it, they were the last to leave Russia. They sustained heavy losses during the campaign: only 26,000 of the original 98,000-strong contingent returned. The elite Vistula Legion entering Russia was about 7,000 strong; its strength at the end of the campaign was just 1,500.

The definitive end of the Polish Legions came with the conclusion of Napoleon's career and the abolition of the Duchy of Warsaw. The Duchy was occupied by Prussian and Russian troops following Napoleon's retreat from Russia. The Polish troops remained loyal to him until the bitter end, with Polish units holding their ground at his last battles at Leipzig (15–19 October 1813) and Hanau (30–31 October 1813), where they sustained major losses. The Legion was recreated at Sedan in early 1814, and fought at Soissons, Reims, Arcis-sur-Aube and St-Dizier. After Napoleon's defeat in the War of the Sixth Coalition, when Napoleon was forced into exile on Elba, the only unit he was allowed to keep as guards were the Polish Lancers. While many Poles returned to the Polish territories, a unit of about 325 men under Colonel Golaszewski fought in Napoleon's final 1815 campaign, the "Hundred Days", participating in the Battle of Waterloo. After Napoleon's second and final defeat, some are said to have accompanied him to his exile on Saint Helena.

Assessment and remembrance
In analyzing the creation of the Polish Legions, many historians have argued that Napoleon used the Poles as a source of recruits and had little desire to invest in the re-creation of the Polish state. Among the most notable of Napoleon's contemporary Polish detractors was Kościuszko, who refused to join the Legions, arguing that Napoleon would not restore Poland in any durable form. In this regard, Kościuszko also stated that the Duchy of Warsaw was created in 1807 only because it was expedient, rather than because Napoleon supported Polish sovereignty. Nevertheless, the memory of Napoleon's Polish Legions is strong in Poland, and Napoleon himself is often regarded as a hero and liberator there. About the Polish Legion, Napoleon himself is reputed to have said that 800 Poles would equal 8,000 enemy soldiers.

Despite their destruction, the Legions became legendary in Poland, helping to spread the civic and democratic ideals of the French Revolution throughout the country. The legionnaires formed a cadre for the Army of the Duchy of Warsaw and also later for the Army of the Congress Kingdom.

The Legions are also notable as the source of one of the themes contained in the future Polish national anthem, "Mazurek Dąbrowskiego". Written by Józef Wybicki, it includes words promising "the return of the Polish army from Italy to Poland" and states that "Poland is not lost as long as we live" in reference to the Polish Legions.

See also
 Great Emigration
 History of Poland (1795-1918)
 List of Polish legionnaires (Napoleonic period)
 Polish–Russian War of 1792

References

Further reading
List based on the compilation of Polish Genealogical Society of America 
 Jan Pachonski, Reuel K. Wilson. Poland's Caribbean Tragedy: A Study of Polish Legions in the Haitian War of Independence 1802–1803. East European Monographs, 1986. .
 Leonard Chodźko, Histoire Des Légions Polonaises en Italie, Paris, 1929. (Important first comprehensive study of the Polish Legions in Italy during the Napoleonic wars which contains many references to officers and enlisted men.)
 Elena I. Fedosova, Polish Projects of Napoleon Bonaparte, The Journal of the International Napoleonic Society, 1/2/98
 Bronisław Gembarzewski, Wojsko Polskie. Ksiestwo Warszawskie 1807–1814. Warszawa, 1905 (lst), 1912, (2nd) edition. (The best reference on the Army of the Duchy of Warsaw contains a list of officers of the Duchy of Warsaw from 1809 to 1814 as well as a list of officers of the Lithuanian Regiments in 1812.)
 Stanisław Kirkor, Legia Nadwislanska, 1808–1814. Londyn, 1981. (The best history of the Vistula Legion contains biographical sketches of all officers and sometimes includes not only the father's name but the mothers maiden name also. It also lists the recipients of Virtuti Militari and the Legion of Honour.)
 Stanisław Kirkor, Pod Sztandarami Napoleona, Londyn, 1982. (Under the Standards of Napoleon has lists of officers of the 4th, 7th and 9th Regiments of infantry of the Duchy of Warsaw which was the Polish Division in the service of France and Napoleon in Spain. It also lists the officers and enlisted men of the Elba Squadron and contains other articles about Napoleonic Polish officers.)
 Kozlowski, Historya lgo Potem 9go Pulku Wielkiego Ksiestwa Warszawskiego, Napisana Prez Kpt. Kozlowskiego, Poznań – Kraków, 1887. (Captain Kozlowski presents a history of the 1st and later 9th regiment of the Duchy of Warsaw.)
 Jonathan North, War of Lost Hope, Polish Accounts of the Napoleonic Expedition to Saint Domingue, 1801 to 1804. London, 2018.
 Jan Pachonski, Legiony Polskie. Prawda i Legenda, 1794–1807. Warszawa, I-1969, II-1976, III-1971, IV-1979. (The most scholarly comprehensive work ever done on the Polish Legions which includes biographical sketches of practically all officers including birthplaces, parents' names as well as service records.)
 Jan Pachonski, Polacy Na Antylach i Morzu Karaibskim, Kraków, 1979. (Sketches of officers and some enlisted men who served in the various islands of the Caribbean during the Napoleonic wars.)
 Aleksander Rembowski, Żródła do Historii Pulku Polskiego Lekkokonnego Gwardii Napoleona I, Wyd. A. Rembowski, Warszawa, 1899. (The best book on the Polish Light Horse of the Guard contains a complete list of all officers and enlisted men with reference to their service records.)
 A.M. Skałkowski, Polacy Na San Domingo, 1802–1809. Poznań, 1921. (One of the best early works on the San Domingo war which lists most officers and some enlisted men.)
 Joseph Tyszkiewicz, Histoire Du 17ième Régiment De Cavalerie Polonaise Ðe Lanciers Du Comte Michel Tyszkiewlcz, 1812–1815. Cracow, 1904. (Limited edition regimental history of the 17th Lancers contains a complete listing of all officers and enlisted men of this so-called Lithuanian regiment.)
 Henry Lachougue; Ann Brown, The Anatomy of Glory, Napoleon and His Guard, Providence, R.I., London, 1962, (2nd) ed. New York, 1978, (3rd) ed.

Fiction

 Michael Large, Song of the Legions, 2011, a novel about the origin of the Polish Legion, .

External links

 Napoleon and the Duchy of Warsaw
 Polish Army of the Napoleonic Wars
 Napoleon.gery.pl

 

fi:Puolan Legioona